Giuseppe Piazzi (16 July 1746 – 22 July 1826) was an Italian Catholic priest of the Theatine order, mathematician, and astronomer. He established an observatory at Palermo, now the Osservatorio Astronomico di Palermo – Giuseppe S. Vaiana. Perhaps his most famous discovery was the first dwarf planet, Ceres.

Early life 

No documented account of Piazzi's scientific education is available in any of the biographies of the astronomer, even in the oldest ones. Piazzi certainly did some studies in Turin, quite likely attending Giovan Battista Beccaria's lessons. In the years 1768–1770 he was resident at the Theatines' Home in S. Andrea della Valle, Rome, while studying Mathematics under François Jacquier.

In July 1770, he took the chair of Mathematics at the University of Malta. 
In December 1773, he moved to Ravenna as "prefetto degli studenti" and lecturer in Philosophy and Mathematics at the Collegio dei Nobili, where he stayed until the beginning of 1779. After a short period spent in Cremona and in Rome, in March 1781 Piazzi moved to Palermo as lecturer in Mathematics at the University of Palermo (at the time known as "Accademia de' Regj Studi").

He kept this position until 19 January 1787, when he became Professor of Astronomy. Almost at the same time, he was granted permission to spend two years in Paris and London, to undergo some practical training in astronomy and also to get some instruments to be specially built for the Palermo Observatory, whose foundation he was in charge of.

In the period spent abroad, from 13 March 1787 until the end of 1789, Piazzi became acquainted with the major French and English astronomers of his time and was able to have the famous altazimuthal circle made by Jesse Ramsden, one of the most skilled instrument-makers of the 18th century. 
The circle was the most important instrument of the Palermo Observatory, whose official foundation took place on 1 July 1790.

In 1817, King Ferdinand put Piazzi in charge of the completion of the Capodimonte (Naples) Observatory, naming him General Director of the Naples and Sicily Observatories.

Astronomy career

Star cataloguing

He supervised the compilation of the Palermo Catalogue of stars, containing 7,646 star entries with unprecedented precision, including the star names "Garnet Star" from Herschel, and the original Rotanev and Sualocin. The work to observe the sky methodically. The catalogue wasn't finished for first edition publication until 1803, with a second edition in 1814.

Spurred by the success discovering Ceres (see below), and in the line of his catalogue program, Piazzi studied the proper motions of stars to find parallax measurement candidates. One of them, 61 Cygni, was specially appointed as a good candidate for measuring a parallax, which was later performed by Friedrich Wilhelm Bessel. The star system 61 Cygni is sometimes still called variously Piazzi's Flying Star and Bessel's Star.

The dwarf planet Ceres

Piazzi discovered Ceres. On 1 January 1801 Piazzi discovered a "stellar object" that moved against the background of stars. At first he thought it was a fixed star, but once he noticed that it moved, he became convinced it was a planet, or as he called it, "a new star".

In his journal, he wrote: 

In spite of his assumption that it was a planet, he took the conservative route and announced it as a comet. In a letter to astronomer Barnaba Oriani of Milan he made his suspicions known in writing:

He was not able to observe it long enough as it was soon lost in the glare of the Sun. Unable to compute its orbit with existing methods, the mathematician Carl Friedrich Gauss developed a new method of orbit calculation that allowed astronomers to locate it again. After its orbit was better determined, it was clear that Piazzi's assumption was correct and this object was not a comet but more like a small planet. Coincidentally, it was also almost exactly where the Titius-Bode law predicted a planet would be.

Piazzi named it "Ceres Ferdinandea," after the Roman and Sicilian goddess of grain and King Ferdinand IV of Naples and Sicily. The Ferdinandea part was later dropped for political reasons. Ceres turned out to be the first, and largest, of the asteroids existing within the asteroid belt. Ceres is today called a dwarf planet.

Posthumous honours

Born in Italy and named in his honour was the astronomer Charles Piazzi Smyth, son of the astronomer William Henry Smyth. In 1871, a memorial statue of Piazzi sculpted by Costantino Corti was dedicated in the main plaza of his birthplace, Ponte. In 1923, the 1000th asteroid to be numbered was named 1000 Piazzia in his honour. The lunar crater Piazzi was named after him in 1935. More recently, a large albedo feature, probably a crater, imaged by the Hubble Space Telescope on Ceres, has been informally named Piazzi.

Works

See also
 Niccolò Cacciatore, his assistant and successor in the post as director
 List of Roman Catholic scientist-clerics

References

Sources
 Clifford Cunningham, Brian Marsden, Wayne Orchiston. (2011) "Giuseppe Piazzi: the controversial discovery and loss of Ceres in 1801." Journal for the History of Astronomy, Volume 42.

External links

 
 Catholic Encyclopedia entry for Giuseppe Piazzi
 
 Giuseppe Piazzi and the Discovery of Ceres
 Portrait of Giuseppe Piazzi from the Lick Observatory Records Digital Archive, UC Santa Cruz Library's Digital Collections 

1746 births
1826 deaths
People from the Province of Sondrio
18th-century Italian astronomers
Roman Catholic monks
Discoverers of asteroids
18th-century Italian Roman Catholic priests
Theatines
Ceres (dwarf planet)
Fellows of the Royal Society
Honorary members of the Saint Petersburg Academy of Sciences
Catholic clergy scientists
Academic staff of the University of Palermo
Recipients of the Lalande Prize
19th-century Italian astronomers